State Councillor or State Counsellor may refer to:
 State councillor (China), a vice-premier level member of the State Council of China
 Counselor of State (Finland) or Valtioneuvos, title awarded to elder statesmen
 Councillor of State (France) or Conseiller d'État, member of the French Conseil d'État, high administrative court
 State Counsellor of Myanmar, a former position within the Government of Myanmar
 State Councillor (Russia), a high civil rank in Imperial Russia
 The State Counsellor, the seventh novel in the Erast Fandorin series by Boris Akunin
 The State Counsellor (film), a 2005 Russian film based on the novel
 Counsellor of State (United Kingdom), individuals to whom the monarch delegates certain state functions and powers

See also
 Counselor of the United States Department of State
 State Council (disambiguation)
 Council of State
 Conseiller d'État (disambiguation)